Anne O'Hare McCormick (16 May 1880 – 29 May 1954) was an English-American journalist who worked as a foreign news correspondent for The New York Times. In an era where the field was almost exclusively "a man's world", she became the first woman to receive a Pulitzer Prize in a major journalism category, winning in 1937 for correspondence. Her husband's job led to frequent travels abroad, and her career as a journalist became more specialized.

In 1921, she approached The New York Times about the prospect of becoming a freelance contributor from Europe. In 1936, she became the first woman to be appointed to the editorial board of the Times. Her dispatches from Europe that year were recognized with the Pulitzer Prize in 1937.

In 1939, with World War II imminent, McCormick spent five months in 13 different nations, speaking with both political leaders and ordinary citizens in reporting the growing crisis. She was reported to have spent time with President Franklin D. Roosevelt discussing policy. For her reporting during World War II, the War Department honored McCormick in 1946 with a campaign medal in recognition of "outstanding and conspicuous service with the armed forces under difficult and hazardous combat conditions." Also in 1946, McCormick was selected to represent the US as a member of the first delegation to the UNESCO conference at the United Nations.

Early life 
McCormick was born in Wakefield, England on 16 May 1880, to parents Thomas J. O'Hare and Theresa Beatrice (née Berry), the first of three children. She moved to the United States shortly after birth, and lived in Massachusetts before settling in Columbus, Ohio. Her father deserted the family in 1894. She was educated at the College of Saint Mary of the Springs, which was then a high school. When it became a four-year college, they gave her the first of her 17 honorary degrees. She never attended university.

After her graduation in 1898 as valedictorian, the family moved to Cleveland, where McCormick's mother sold her book, Songs at Twilight, and both of them became associate editors for the Catholic Universe Bulletin. Anne O'Hare married Dayton businessman Francis J. McCormick, Jr. (1872–1954), an importer and executive of the Dayton Plumbing Supply Company, on 14 September 1910. They settled in a Dayton house called "Hills and Dales," which they left in the 1930s to take up residence in the Gotham and then the Carlyle hotel in New York City, when not traveling in Europe.

Journalism career 
In Dayton, McCormick began freelance writing and traveling to Europe on her husband's buying trips. Her work was first published by the Catholic World, The Reader Magazine, The Smart Set, The Bookman and The New York Times Magazine. In 1917 she wrote about the barriers to women in journalism. In 1921 asked Carr Van Anda if she could contribute articles to the New York Times, to cover stories not already investigated by the Times' foreign reporters. The Times accepted, and McCormick provided the first in-depth reports of the rise of Benito Mussolini and the Fascist movement in Italy. As described in a Current Biography article in 1940, "she was perhaps the first reporter to see that a young Milanese newspaper editor, lantern-jawed, hungry and insignificant, would attain world importance". James Reston said, "She put a glow on everything she wrote," and in 1999, 45 years after her death, said, "She is in my mind still."

In 1935, McCormick was named one of America's ten outstanding women by the suffragist Carrie Chapman Catt.
The New York Times publisher, Adolph Ochs did not hire women reporters, so she remained a special correspondent until he died. The next publisher, Arthur Hays Sulzberger put her on staff June 1, 1936, as the first woman member of the editorial board, at a starting salary of $7,000 per year. When she died in the 1950s she earned $30,624, more than all but four men in the paper's news staff.

She began a regular column February 1, 1937. Prior to the start of World War II, McCormick obtained interviews with Italian Prime Minister Benito Mussolini, German leader Adolf Hitler, Soviet Premier Joseph Stalin, Prime Minister of the United Kingdom Winston Churchill, President of the United States Franklin D. Roosevelt, Popes Pius XI and XII, and other world leaders. She recognized Hitler's popularity in Germany, while other US reporters were surprised at his election successes. After the war she covered the Nuremberg trials and the Greek civil war, and criticized John Foster Dulles for threatening to use the atom bomb before the USSR had it.

McCormick died in New York on May 29, 1954, and is buried at Gate of Heaven cemetery in Hawthorne, NY. Her death was reported on the front page of the paper.
President Eisenhower called her "a truly great reporter, respected at home and abroad for her keen analysis and impartial presentation of the news developments of our day. She will be greatly missed by all the members of the newspaper profession and the hundreds of thousands of readers who followed her column in the New York Times." British Foreign Minister Anthony Eden called her a "champion of all good causes." French Foreign Minister Georges Bidault said "this woman... has left us at a moment when her courage and her clairvoyance would have been particularly precious for us."

Honors
In 1945, the Altrusa International service club for executive and professional women presented McCormick with its distinguished service award.

In 1949, the American Irish Historical Society presented McCormick with a gold medal "in recognition of her eminence in journalism."

The New York Newspaper Women's Club, where McCormick served multiple terms as vice president, created the Anne O'Hare McCormick Journalism Scholarship in her memory. The scholarship is for female students at the Columbia University Graduate School of Journalism, with the first $500 memorial scholarship being awarded to Mary Kay Johnson of Wakefield, Rhode Island, in 1955.

McCormick received the Siena Medal From Theta Phi Alpha in 1941.

Books
The World at Home (1956)
Vatican Journal 1921-1954 (1957)
The Hammer and the Scythe: Communist Russia Enters the Second Decade (1928)
St. Agnes Church. Cleveland. Ohio. An interpretation (1920)
 Europa e Stati Uniti secondo il New York Times : la corrispondenza estera di Anne O'Hare McCormick, 1920-1954 (2000)

Sources
"Anne O'Hare McCormick and the Changing Times" chapter in Women of the World, the Great Foreign Correspondents, Julia Edwards, Ivy Books, 1988.
Current Biography 1940 Yearbook, 530–531.
"Mistress McCormick" chapter 2 in 
"Elizabeth A. McCormick", Ohio History Central, July 1, 2005.
"Anne O'Hare McCormick Is Dead; Member of Times Editorial Board; Pulitzer Prize Winner in 1937 Interpreted News in Her Column, 'Abroad'," The New York Times 30 May 1954, pages 1, 44.
Papers of Anne O'Hare McCormick at the New York Public Library
Archives of Catholic Universe Bulletin at the Catholic Diocese of Cleveland

References

The New York Times writers
1880 births
1954 deaths
Pulitzer Prize for Correspondence winners
The New York Times Pulitzer Prize winners
Ohio Dominican University alumni
People from Wakefield
English emigrants to the United States
Laetare Medal recipients
Burials at Gate of Heaven Cemetery (Hawthorne, New York)